Breeden is an unincorporated community in Mingo County, West Virginia, United States. Breeden has a post office with ZIP code 25666.

Breeden most likely was named after an early settler.

References

Unincorporated communities in Mingo County, West Virginia
Unincorporated communities in West Virginia